Mixed doubles curling at the 2016 Winter Youth Olympics was held from February 19 to 21 at Kristins Hall in Lillehammer, Norway.

Teams
The teams will consist of athletes from the mixed team tournament, one boy and one girl from different NOCs. The teams will be selected by the organizing committee based on the final ranking from the mixed team competition in a way that balances out the teams, and will be assigned on February 17. The players in each pair will then be allowed time to train together.

Knockout Draw Bracket

Finals

Top Half

Bottom Half

Knockout results
All draw times are listed in Central European Time (UTC+01).

Round of 32

Draw 1
Friday, February 19, 9:00

Draw 2
Friday, February 19, 12:30

Draw 3
Friday, February 19, 16:00

Draw 4
Friday, February 19, 19:30

Round of 16

Draw 1
Saturday, February 20, 9:00

Draw 2
Saturday, February 20, 13:00

Quarterfinals
Saturday, February 20, 17:00

Semifinals
Sunday, February 21, 9:00

Bronze Medal Game
Sunday, February 21, 13:00

Gold Medal Game
Sunday, February 21, 13:00

References

External links

World Curling Federation event page

Mixed doubles
Olympics